Henri GoddingDe opening der Olympiade - uitslagen der eerste wedstrijden, Nieuwe Gazet, 16 August 1920 (28 May 1892 – 16 October 1980) was a Belgian middle-distance runner. He competed in the men's 800 metres at the 1920 Summer Olympics.

References

1892 births
1980 deaths
Athletes (track and field) at the 1920 Summer Olympics
Belgian male middle-distance runners
Olympic athletes of Belgium
Place of birth missing